Macotasa nedoshivinae is a moth of the family Erebidae. It was described by Vladimir Viktorovitch Dubatolov in 2012 and is endemic to Vietnam.

The species exhibits sexual dimorphism. The forewings of the males have a brownish-black trapezoid spot at the middle of the costa and an elongate patch of androconial scales in the discal cell along the radial vein. The hindwings are yellow in the basal, medial and tornal parts, with a brownish-grey apex and outer margin. The females have grey forewings with a lighter costal margin. There is a black triangular spot at the costa at three-fifths from the base and a subapical shadow. The hindwings are yellow.

References

External links

Moths described in 2012
Endemic fauna of Vietnam
Lithosiina